Leptoconops fortipalpus is a species of biting midge belonging to the family Ceratopogonidae. It occurs in the Damodar River valley, Jarkhand state, India.

References

Leptoconops
Insects of India
Insects described in 2010
Hematophages